Leonel Wilfredo Ruíz Carmona (born July 27, 1975, in Caracas, Venezuela) is a Venezuelan judoka, who competed in the men's heavyweight category. He picked up a gold medal in the over-100 kg division at the 2004 Pan American Championships in Margarita Island, and also represented his nation Venezuela at the 2004 Summer Olympics.

Ruiz qualified for the Venezuelan squad in the men's heavyweight class (+100 kg) at the 2004 Summer Olympics in Athens, by topping the field in his own division and receiving a berth from the Pan American Championships in Margarita Island. Much to the delight to the home crowd inside Ano Liossia Hall, Ruiz fell short in a, full-minute ippon and a yoko shiho gatame to the host nation Greece's Charalampos Papaioannou during their opening match.

References

External links

1975 births
Living people
Venezuelan male judoka
Olympic judoka of Venezuela
Judoka at the 2004 Summer Olympics
Judoka at the 2007 Pan American Games
Sportspeople from Caracas
Pan American Games competitors for Venezuela
20th-century Venezuelan people
21st-century Venezuelan people